John Ratcliffe or John Ratcliff may refer to:

Politicians
John Ratcliffe (American politician), former Director of National Intelligence, former congressman in Texas' 4th Congressional District, and former U.S. Attorney in the Eastern District of Texas.
John Ratcliffe (died 1673), MP for Chester
John Ratcliffe (died 1633)
John Ratcliffe (16th-century MP), MP for Lancashire and Wigan
 John Ratcliffe (governor) (died 1609), English sailor and colonial governor of Virginia, portrayed fictionally as the main antagonist in the 1995 Disney movie Pocahontas. 
 Sir John Ratcliffe, Lord Mayor of Birmingham 1856-58
 John Ratcliffe (soldier) (1582–1627), English soldier and politician

Others
 J. A. Ratcliffe (1902–1987), British radio physicist
 John Henry Ratcliffe, one of the founders of McLeod Young Weir Co. & Ltd.
 John Ratcliffe (book collector)
 John W. Ratcliff, video game developer
 John Ratcliff (bookbinder)
 John Ratcliff (cricketer)
 John Ratcliff (producer), Producer for "Take On Me".
 John Ratcliffe (Master of Pembroke) and Clergyman (1700–1775)

See also
 John Radcliffe (disambiguation)